Herbert Philip Cartwright (8 February 1908 – October 1974) was an English footballer who scored 24 goals in 129 appearances in the Football League playing for Bradford Park Avenue, Hull City, Lincoln City and Carlisle United. He played as an outside forward. He was on the books of Bradford Park Avenue, Bournemouth & Boscombe Athletic and Rotherham United without appearing in the league, and also played non-league football for Scarborough.

References

1908 births
1974 deaths
Sportspeople from Scarborough, North Yorkshire
English footballers
Association football forwards
Scarborough F.C. players
Middlesbrough F.C. players
Bradford (Park Avenue) A.F.C. players
Hull City A.F.C. players
AFC Bournemouth players
Lincoln City F.C. players
Carlisle United F.C. players
Rotherham United F.C. players
English Football League players
Footballers from North Yorkshire